163–169 Sussex Street  were heritage-listed terrace houses located at 163-169 Sussex Street, in the Sydney central business district, in the City of Sydney local government area of New South Wales, Australia. The property is owned by Property NSW, an agency of the Government of New South Wales. It was added to the New South Wales State Heritage Register on 2 April 1999.

 the terrace houses were removed and the site forms part of a major hotel development, with street markers indicating some of the heritage of the area.

History

Description 

As of 2016 the terrace houses that were previously located at 163-169 Sussex Street were demolished and made way for the Hyatt Regency Sydney/Four Point development. All that remains is a heritage marker on the driveway in the hotel forecourt.

Typical mid-nineteenth century terrace houses; painted brick with iron roof. No. 163 has largely original exterior; Nos. 165-169 have been renovated and refaced but have maintained the original scale of the facade and fenestration.

Heritage listing 
163–169 Sussex Street was listed on the New South Wales State Heritage Register on 2 April 1999.

See also 

Australian non-residential architectural styles

References

Attribution 

New South Wales State Heritage Register sites located in the Sydney central business district
Articles incorporating text from the New South Wales State Heritage Register
Sussex Street, Sydney
Terraced houses in Sydney